Tom Kapitany (born 15 December 1960) is an Australian botanist, geologist and entrepreneur. Kapitany is the director of Crystal World in Victoria, Australia, a director of National Dinosaur Museum in Canberra, Australia, a director of Collectors Corner Garden World in Braeside, Victoria, Australia, director of Australian Mineral Mines Pty. Ltd. and an international consultant for museums and universities, particularly in China, Mexico, UK, US, New Zealand and Indonesia with regards to geology.

Kapitany completed his B.Sc. in geology and botany at the University of Melbourne in 1984 and has held multiple mining tenements around Australia. Kapitany has made numerous donations to the Museum of Victoria and other museums and institutions worldwide. Kapitany is known for raising awareness on the importance of collecting and fossicking minerals and fossils; to educate people and children on fossils and rocks of biological origin. However, as one of Australia's largest commercial dealers of minerals and fossils, he is a controversial figure owing to revelations of his involvement with international fossil smuggling.

Career

Crystal World 
Tom Kapitany started Crystal World Exhibition Centre in 1999 following his involvement with the family business' retail nursery Collectors Corner. Kapitany would frequently travel the world to source natural history specimens. Through Crystal World, Kapitany has hosted fundraising activities to help the Australian Animal Rescue charity.

In February 2019, Kapitany and Australian Animal Rescue rescued Rosie the Shark, a preserved great white shark facing vandalism at the abandoned wildlife park Wildlife Wonderland and was rehoused at Crystal World in Devon Meadows. The shark was originally preserved in formaldehyde which caused major disruptions to its relocation due to the toxic nature of the chemical.

National Dinosaur Museum 
Tom Kapitany is one of five directors of the National Dinosaur Museum in Canberra, Australia. Since taking charge of the museum's dinosaur exhibits, he added several animated and static model dinosaurs within its paid museum area, including the addition of a dinosaur garden featuring an 8 metre tall model Tyrannosaurus.

Television 
In 2002, ABC Catalyst interviewed Tom Kapitany on the topic of fossil protection within Australia; saying that "we shouldn't condemn the whole fossil community based on a few rogue collectors. Nor should we condemn the scientific community on a few rogue scientists."

Kapitany also noted the difficulties involved in the processes of mining and exploration, stating that "it's very difficult for me to find out what I can legally and I can't legally do. And even the museum at times can't give me clear definitions or answers."

Kapitany continued, saying "95 percent of new fossil discoveries are actually found by private individuals. A number of sites I’ve been to, locals are reluctant to show museum specimens because they’re concerned that the museums will close down the site or restrict activity or restrict access. The more you legislate and protect certain things, the less the museums will be made aware of them."

Books 
In 2002, Tom Kapitany was interviewed for his professional advice regarding the international fossil market. In the book The Dinosaur Dealers Kapitany gave insight into the market of rare fossils such as dinosaur footprint specimens. Kapitany was also asked into the possible whereabouts of stolen fossils; such as the late 1996 unrecovered stolen dinosaur footprints from Broome. In 2013 Tom Kapitany purchased a small piece of the Chelyabinsk meteorite roughly the size of an Australian 20 cent coin.

Tom Kapitany was noted for his significance in bringing heteromorph fossil specimens of Blackdown formation in Queensland to international recognition in the geological catalog Heteromorph by Wolfgang Grulke.

Scientific reports 
Tom Kapitany was co-author of a 2019 scientific report on tree ring phototropism and its implications for the rotation of the North China Block.

Was co-author of the 2019 scientific paper titled "Modelling U-Pb discordance in the Acasta Gneiss: Implications for fluid–rock interaction in Earth's oldest dated crust".

References 

20th-century Australian botanists
Australian geologists
1960 births
Living people
21st-century Australian botanists